Fyodor Fyodorovich Cherenkov (25 July 1959 – 4 October 2014) was a Soviet and Russian football midfielder who played for Spartak Moscow (1977–90 and 1991–94) and Red Star Football Club (1990–91).

Playing career
Cherenkov made 34 appearances for the Soviet Union national team, scoring 12 goals. Although widely regarded by Spartak's fans as the team's best player ever, he was always dropped by the national team on the eve of several major tournaments, including two World Cups and a European Championship. For the time spent in Spartak he received the Club Loyalty Award in 1989. He was an incredible passer and was also great at shooting the ball and scored many goals. Cherenkov worked as a coach of Spartak's reserve team after retiring. He was awarded "The Attack Organizer" award in 1988 and 1989, as the most useful attack player. In his history of Spartak, Robert Edelman described him as "the longest-serving and most beloved of all Spartakovtsy":A native Muscovite, Fiodr Cherenkov (b. 1959) was a product of Spartak's school. Navigating between midfield and forward, he played with an originality and eccentricity that endeared him to the public. Cherenkov was an enigmatic and fragile personality whose capacity for unexpected improvisation fit the Spartak image of the player as romantic artist. A true original, he was the embodiment of what many of Spartak's male Moscow supporters liked to believe about themselves. Lacking great speed but quick on his feet, small of stature but possessed of great guile, Cherenkov seemed to practice a new kind of masculinity, that of the urban trickster. By the time his Spartak career was over, he was the leading point producer (goal plus pass) in the team's history.

Life and personality 

A 2021 profile on BBC Sport relates that Cherenkov was a kind and approachable "regular guy" who could not understand his own fame.  He suffered several attacks of an unknown mental illness during his playing career, and missed important games because of it, but was "widely seen as the best Soviet footballer of the decade".  His daughter Anastasia was born in 1980.  He died in 2014, at age 55, after collapsing outside his home.  An autopsy at a Moscow hospital found a brain tumour.  The profile described him as a "football genius".

Honours 
 1979, 1987, 1989 – Soviet Top League
 1993 – Russian Premier League
 1994 – Russian Cup
 1983, 1989 – Soviet Footballer of the Year
 1989 - Club Loyalty Award

References

External links

  Fyodor Cherenkov's profile at Spartak's official website
  Profile and interview

1959 births
2014 deaths
Moscow State Mining University alumni
Association football midfielders
Soviet footballers
Russian footballers
Footballers from Moscow
Russian football managers
FC Spartak Moscow players
Red Star F.C. players
Olympic footballers of the Soviet Union
Olympic bronze medalists for the Soviet Union
Footballers at the 1980 Summer Olympics
Soviet Union international footballers
Soviet expatriate footballers
Expatriate footballers in France
Soviet expatriate sportspeople in France
Soviet Top League players
Ligue 2 players
Russian Premier League players
Olympic medalists in football
Medalists at the 1980 Summer Olympics
Deaths from brain cancer in Russia
Burials in Troyekurovskoye Cemetery